The following is a list of the 17 cantons of the Gers department, in France, following the French canton reorganisation which came into effect in March 2015:

 Adour-Gersoise
 Armagnac-Ténarèze
 Astarac-Gimone
 Auch-1
 Auch-2
 Auch-3
 Baïse-Armagnac
 Fezensac
 Fleurance-Lomagne
 Gascogne-Auscitaine
 Gimone-Arrats
 Grand-Bas-Armagnac
 L'Isle-Jourdain
 Lectoure-Lomagne
 Mirande-Astarac
 Pardiac-Rivière-Basse
 Val de Save

References